The Hamilton Township Schools are a comprehensive community public school district, serving students in pre-kindergarten through eighth grade from Hamilton Township, in Atlantic County, New Jersey, United States.

As of the 2021–22 school year, the district, comprised of three schools, had an enrollment of 2,974 students and 254.4 classroom teachers (on an FTE basis), for a student–teacher ratio of 11.7:1.

The district is classified by the New Jersey Department of Education as being in District Factor Group "CD", the sixth-highest of eight groupings. District Factor Groups organize districts statewide to allow comparison by common socioeconomic characteristics of the local districts. From lowest socioeconomic status to highest, the categories are A, B, CD, DE, FG, GH, I and J.

Public school students in ninth through twelfth grades attend Oakcrest High School, located in Hamilton Township, which serves students from Hamilton Township. As of the 2021–22 school year, the high school had an enrollment of 952 students and 87.8 classroom teachers (on an FTE basis), for a student–teacher ratio of 10.8:1. The high school is part of the Greater Egg Harbor Regional High School District, a regional high school district serving students at the district's two other schools, Absegami High School and Cedar Creek High School, from the other constituent districts of Egg Harbor City, Galloway Township and Mullica Township, together with students from the City of Port Republic and Washington Township (in Burlington County), who attend as part of sending/receiving relationships with their respective school districts.

History
In 2009-2010 the district had 3,889 students, its peak enrollment. Enrollment decreased afterward due to a decline in casino jobs. Between 2010-2011 and 2014 its enrollment declined by almost 11%.

Awards, recognition and rankings
For the 1998-99 school year, the George L. Hess Educational Complex was recognized with the National Blue Ribbon Award from the United States Department of Education, the highest honor that an American school can achieve.

George L. Hess Education Complex was named as a "Star School" by the New Jersey Department of Education, the highest honor that a New Jersey school can achieve, in the 1994-95 school year

Schools
Schools in the district (with 2021–22 enrollment data from the National Center for Education Statistics) are:
Elementary schools
Joseph C. Shaner Memorial School with 628 students in grades K-1
Daniel M. Cartwright, Principal
George Hess Educational Complex with 1,263 in pre-kindergarten and grades 2-5
Melanie E. Lamanteer, Principal
Middle school
William Davies Middle School with 979 students in grades 6-8
Dr. Jennifer Holmstrom, Principal

Administration
Core members of the district's administration are:
Dr. Jeffery Zito, Superintendent
Anne-Marie Fala, Business Administrator / Board Secretary

Board of education
The district's board of education, comprised of nine members, sets policy and oversees the fiscal and educational operation of the district through its administration. As a Type II school district, the board's trustees are elected directly by voters to serve three-year terms of office on a staggered basis, with three seats up for election each year held (since 2012) as part of the November general election. The board appoints a superintendent to oversee the district's day-to-day operations and a business administrator to supervise the business functions of the district.

References

External links
Hamilton Township Schools

School Data for the Hamilton Township Schools, National Center for Education Statistics
Oakcrest High School website
Greater Egg Harbor Regional High School District

Hamilton Township, Atlantic County, New Jersey
New Jersey District Factor Group CD
School districts in Atlantic County, New Jersey